Sam Darling or Samuel Darling may refer to:
 Samuel Taylor Darling, American pathologist and bacteriologist
 Sam Darling (jockey, born 1826) Rode in 1850 Grand National
 Sam Darling (jockey, born 1852), jockey and trainer at Beckhampton